We Go Together is the first studio album by American country music artists George Jones and Tammy Wynette 1971.

We Go Together may also refer to: 
"We Go Together", single by Jan and Dean charted #53 1960
"We Go Together" (Grease song), song written by Warren Casey, Jim Jacobs 1971
"We Go Together", song written by Sammy Lyons, Danny Walls, Norris Wilson from the album We Go Together, beginning  "The places where we used to meet we go together"